Mohd Zolkafly bin Harun is a Malaysian politician who has served as Member of the Perak State Executive Council (EXCO) in the Perikatan Nasional (PN) and Barisan Nasional (BN) state administrations under Menteris Besar Ahmad Faizal Azumu and Saarani Mohamad since May 2020 and Member of the Perak State Legislative Assembly (EXCO) for Lintang since May 2013. He is a member of the United Malays National Organisation (UMNO), a component party of the BN coalition.

Election Results

Honours

Honours of Malaysia 
  :
  Officer of the Order of the Defender of the Realm (KMN) (2017)
  :
  Knight Commander of the Order of the Perak State Crown (DPMP) - Dato' (2006)

Notes

References

Living people
People from Perak
Malaysian people of Malay descent
Malaysian Muslims
United Malays National Organisation politicians
Members of the Perak State Legislative Assembly
Perak state executive councillors
21st-century Malaysian politicians
Year of birth missing (living people)